Action with Communities in Rural England (ACRE) is a registered charity which represents thirty-eight member groups (formerly known as rural community councils) who make up England's largest rural network. The charity claims to engage 52,000 grassroots organisations in 11,000 rural communities.

ACRE was formed in 1987 to bring the rural community councils into a single umbrella group. It aims to gather evidence from grassroots and community organisations, for use in influencing national policy on rural issues, including housing, health, transport, broadband internet access, and fuel poverty.

ACRE works with a range of partner groups who have an interest in assisting rural communities. ACRE is a member of and holds the secretariat for the Rural Coalition – thirteen national organisations who work to promote a living and working countryside in England.

References

External links
 
 BBC – Action within Communities in Rural England

Charities based in Gloucestershire
Rural community development
Conservation in England
Town and country planning in England
English coast and countryside
Community development organizations